The 2020 San Diego mayoral election was held on November 3, 2020 to elect the Mayor of San Diego. Incumbent Kevin Faulconer was ineligible to run for a third term due to term limits.

The officially non-partisan primary election was held on March 3, 2020. The top two finishers, California State Assemblymember and former acting mayor Todd Gloria and San Diego City Council president pro tem Barbara Bry advanced to the general election. This guaranteed that a Democrat would be elected mayor of San Diego for only the third time since 1971. Gloria was then elected mayor in the November 3 election, making him the first Native American and Filipino-American mayor elected in a US city of over a million people, as well as the city's first mayor of color and the city's first openly gay mayor.

Candidates
Note: Municipal elections in California are officially nonpartisan. The parties below identify which party label each candidate would have run under if given the option.

Qualified
Gita Appelbaum Singh, media host (Party preference: Democratic)
Barbara Bry, San Diego City Councillor (Party preference: Democratic)
Todd Gloria, California State Assemblymember and former Acting Mayor of San Diego (Party preference: Democratic)
Rich Riel, technology worker (Party preference: Hogwash)
Scott Sherman, San Diego City Councillor (Party preference:  Republican)
Tasha Williamson, nonprofit executive (Party preference: Democratic)
Jarvis Gandy (write-in)

Declined
Toni Atkins, California State Senator (Party preference: Democratic)
Cory Briggs, attorney (Party preference: None)
Chris Cate, San Diego City Councillor (Party preference: Republican)
John Cox, businessman and nominee for Governor of California in 2018 (Party preference: Republican)
Carl DeMaio, former member of San Diego City Council, and candidate for mayor in 2012. (Party preference: Republican)
Mark Kersey, San Diego City Councillor (Party preference: None)
Scott Peters, member of the United States House of Representatives (Party preference: Democratic)
Shelley Zimmerman, former Chief of Police of the San Diego Police Department (Party preference: None)

Campaign
The campaign for the mayor's office kicked off in early January 2019, when San Diego City Council president pro tem Barbara Bry and California State Assemblymember Todd Gloria officially announced their candidacies. They were joined in the race later that month by Tasha Williamson, a community activist who works with families who have lost members from police violence. In November 2019, with less than 100 days to go before the primary, city council member Scott Sherman became the first major Republican to file papers for the mayoral race.

One of the issues distinguishing the candidates from each other was housing policy. Local activist attorney Cory Briggs announced in January 2019 that he would run for mayor based on opposition to the loosening of development restrictions proposed by incumbent mayor Kevin Faulconer in his State of the City speech. However, Briggs dropped out of the race by May 2019. In a June 2019 campaign email, Bry came out in favor of strong local control over land use and against statewide legislation to preempt local governments' ability to restrict new development. Gloria favored statewide efforts to increase housing supply, aligning himself with the pro-housing development "Yes In My Back Yard" (YIMBY) movement. Sherman emphasized market-based solutions to housing upon his entry into the race in late 2019.

Another major issue was climate. Gloria emphasized his role in the establishment of the San Diego Climate Action Plan, while Bry called for the plan to be expanded and to have better metrics. Williamson spoke about environmental justice while Sherman attributed pollution to unhoused people.

In August 2019, Gloria was accused of collecting funds for his 2020 re-election campaign to the State Assembly before filing his intent to run with the state in violation of state law. Gloria claimed this was a technical oversight and filed the relevant paperwork the next day. In November 2019, Gloria settled the case with the California Fair Political Practices Commission, paying a $200 fine.

Endorsements

Primary election
The primary election was held on Tuesday, March 3, 2020. In the initial results, Gloria led with more than 40% of the vote and was projected to advance to the general election. Sherman narrowly led  Bry by a little over 3,000 votes for the second spot in the general election. By the second day of counting, Bry had reduced Sherman's margin for the second spot by 30 percent to 2,140. Bry continued to gain on Sherman as more votes were counted, and on March 16 her votes surpassed his. The final results released in early April confirmed that Gloria would face Bry in the runoff election. This guaranteed that a Democrat would be elected mayor of San Diego for only the third time since 1971.

Polling

Results

General election

Polling

Results

Notes

References

External links
Official campaign websites
 Barbara Bry for Mayor 
 Todd Gloria for Mayor

San Diego
San Diego
2020
2020s in San Diego